Tele2 AB is a Swedish telecommunications operator headquartered in the Kista Science City, Stockholm, Sweden. It is a major telephone operator in Sweden, Estonia, Latvia and Lithuania. The Tele2 brand is also present in Russia. Tele2 AB sold its Russian subsidiary to state bank VTB in March 2013.  Tele2 also had a 25% share in T-Mobile Netherlands. As of 7 September 2021, Tele2 and Deutsche Telekom have opted to rid themselves of T-Mobile Netherlands in a sale for an enterprise value of €5.1 billion.

Tele2 started as a telecommunications company in Sweden in 1993 by the company Investment AB Kinnevik. It previously operated in many other markets but the company has since divested its licences, sold to other operators or to management buy-outs in those markets.

History
In 1981, a mobile phone provider called Comvik started as an alternative mobile phone operator to Televerket (today known as Telia Company). The cable television provider Kabelvision AB started in 1986. Comvik changed its name to become Comviq when the company got a GSM license in 1988 and started operating in 1992.

In 1991, Sweden's first commercial ISP was started with the Swedish IP Network (Swipnet (sv), AS1257) by Investment AB Kinnevik, later renamed as  Tele2, and in 1993 with telephone liberalisation in Sweden, Tele2 started to offer international calls.

The three companies of Comviq, Kabelvision, and Tele2 came together as the Tele2 brand on fixed-line services and Comviq on mobile services in Sweden in 1997. The Swipnet branding was phased out in 2014. International growth came in the form of acquisitions in Estonia,Lithuania, Latvia, Russia and France.

In November 2018, Tele2 was merged with telecom operator Com Hem, which delivers, among other things, TV, broadband and telephony. In March 2019, it was stated that millions of mobile answers (voicemail) could be intercepted by others.  At the beginning of 2020, the streaming service Comhem Play+ was launched available to those who are not a customer at Com Hem. The same week, the new digital operator Penny was also launched.

Divestments

Tele2's most recent development has been to realign its geographic footprint towards Eastern Europe and the Nordic region focusing on own infrastructure based operations which provide higher growth options and possibly better margins for the future.  One area of notable success has been the growth of the mobile Internet broadband connectivity. Tele2 has achieved the most success in Russian market, with a customer base increasing by the hundreds of thousands yearly.

In 2007 the company sold its holdings in Belgium to Dutch operator KPN, in France to SFR and activities in Spain and Italy to Vodafone Italy, in Portugal to Clix and in Switzerland to TDC Sunrise. In March 2008 Tele2 divested its Austrian MVNO operations to Telekom Austria, although retaining its fixed line and internet services until the latter two services were sold to Hutchison 3 in 2017. In June 2008 Tele2 sold its Liechtenstein and Luxembourg holdings to Belgian operator Belgacom. The same month Tele2 sold its Polish operations to Netia.

Tele2 reportedly attempted to sell its German unit as well in 2007, eventually the sale came through a management buyout in 2020. The newly formed company trades as STROTH Telecom GmbH, but continues to use the old brand as "Tele2 Deutschland".

In 2005 they sold their UK & Ireland fixed operations to Carphone Warehouse for £8.7m.  They also pulled out of the Finnish market stating problems with the competitive and regulatory environment after the Finnish government had previously cancelled their 3G licence, due to not completing a network in time.

Operations

Austria
Tele2 operates in Austria since 1999, starting as an alternative fixed-line telephone operator. ADSL internet services were introduced in 2003. One Year later, Tele2 Austria bought UTA Telekom AG, a former competitor, and became the largest provider for alternative telecommunication service in Austria.  In addition to fixed-line services, Tele2 Austria is using their infrastructure for carrier services.
In the first quarter of 2013, Tele2 Austria had an EBITDA of 38,2 million euros, a rise of 6 percent.

In a brief press statement on 11 November 2014, the Sweden-based telecoms group has confirmed that it plans to re-enter the Austrian mobile sector in the second half of 2015.

In summer 2017 (28.7.2017) Tele2 Austria was bought by Hutchison Drei Austria, the third largest mobile operator in Austria.

Croatia
In Croatia, Tele2 operates a 3G network at 42.2 Mbit/s, same as competitors but at a much wider area, nearly every area covered in standard 3G has access to this 3.75G technology. It also operates a 4G network at up to 150 Mbit/s. , it has 885,542 customers. Revenue for 2015 is 83.72 million euros. On 1 February 2016 Tele2 Croatia started its 4G LTE network. It covers every major city and its surroundings, as well as many rural areas. According to Tele2 Croatia, their 4G network covers 90% of Croatia's population, while their 3G network covers 99% of Croatia's population. In April 2017 Tele2 became the first and as of July 2017 the only mobile operator to offer unlimited flat-rate broadband access without throttling (for voice customers) and partial throttling (for mobile broadband users). In July 2019 it was sold for 220 million euros to United Group.

Estonia
Tele2 is operating an HSPA-enabled 3G network in the 900 MHz and 2100 MHz bands as well as a 2G GSM network in the 900 MHz and 1800 MHz bands.

Tele2 commercially launched its 4G LTE network in the 1800 MHz and 2.6 GHz bands in November 2012. The 800 MHz LTE band was added in May 2014 and 2100 MHz in July 2015. Tele2 claimed an LTE population coverage of 90% in September 2015.

In early 2012, Tele2 acquired Televõrgu AS which operated a CDMA2000 1xEV-DO Rev. A network in the 450 MHz band under the 'Kõu' brand name. This network was shut down in January 2016.

France
Tele2 used to operate as 2G MVNO in France use Orange network for coverage and joined to Virgin Mobile in 2009.

They also used to operate alternative fixed line & internet services which they sold to Vivendi unit SFR for €350 million in 2006.

Germany
In Germany, Tele2 provides fixed broadband via ADSL as well as fixed telephony. In July 2013, Tele2 launched mobile voice plans on the E-Plus (now O2 Germany) network. In December 2020 the unit was sold by a Management buyout with the Trademark Tele2 for Germany.

Italy
Tele2 Italia S.p.A. was the Italian branch of Tele2 Sverige AB active from April 1999 until December 2007.

It has requested deregulation from Telecom Italia, i.e. unbundling, recognized only for Infostrada and FASTWEB.

In the summer of 2005 it began to offer ADSL in large cities including Milan and Rome in unbundling, and then rapidly extended the service to many other areas of Italy as well.

Since January 2006, it has been offering its customers the possibility of detaching from Telecom Italia.

In autumn 2007, it added a P2P traffic filtering function to its ADSL service.

On 6 October 2007 Tele2 Italia S.p.A., as also happened in Spain, was acquired by Vodafone Omnitel N.V. for 775 million euros. This operation is completed in December. Tele2 Italia S.p.A. thus changed its name to Opitel S.p.A., temporarily maintaining the Tele2 brand.

Since, following this operation, Tele2 Italia S.p.A. is no longer in any way linked to Tele2 Sverige AB, the name of the company was changed, which from 4 January 2010 became TeleTu S.p.A.

Kazakhstan
51% of Mobile Telecom-Service LLP was purchased by Tele2 in early 2010 to serve as a base for the company's mobile services in Kazakhstan. Tele2 has an option to buy the remaining 49% of Mobile Telecom-Service LLP within 5 years after the contract was closed. Tele2 is the smallest of three mobile operators in Kazakhstan with about 4.3 million customers.
In December 2018 Tele2 was announced to be closed, leaving Beeline to be the only government-independent carrier.

Latvia
Tele2 operates as one of the largest nationwide 2G/3G/4G MNO(Mobile Network Operator) in Latvia. Tele2 Shared Service Centre is also located in Latvia.

Lithuania
Tele2 operates a nationwide GSM 2G/3G/4G network in Lithuania. Tele2 Lithuania is the only telecommunications operator across Europe and Americas to rocket from the last position to the market leader. Today Tele2 ensure that all its customers can use high quality 4G network coverage across 99% of Lithuania and was named the Most Transparent Company in Lithuania according to "Transparency International Lithuania". Tele2 Lithuania CEO Petras Masiulis was awarded the CEO of the Year 2017 Lithuania.

Netherlands

Tele2 operates as a 2G, 3G and 4G MVNO on the mobile network of T-Mobile NL and in the fourth quarter of 2015 launched the world's first 4G-only MNO in the Netherlands with nearly 850,000 customers in addition to fixed network triple play services, serving over one million customers in total.

Tele2 purchased Versatel in the Netherlands in mid-2005 which allowed it to move away from carrier select services via KPN and onto own infrastructure. The new Tele2 Netherlands offer a full suite of triple play services.

On 15 July 2010, Tele2 demonstrated the first LTE network in the Netherlands on the frequencies (2600 MHz) it was awarded licenses for earlier the same year.

In late 2010, Tele2 Netherlands acquired BBned from Telecom Italia.

The telecom regulator in the Netherlands, Agentschap Telecom, held a multiband auction which concluded on 14 December 2012. Tele2 was awarded 2x10MHz in the 800 MHz band which together with its previous 2.6 GHz license will enable Tele2 to cost efficiently build a high capacity LTE network with national coverage. Tele2 paid €161M for its licenses which can be considered low, compared to the €1.3bn that KPN and Vodafone paid each for their frequencies and the €900M that T-Mobile will have to pay for theirs. The considerably lower price was a result of spectrum reservation set by the government for a new mobile entrant, with favourable acquisition, Tele2 will enable lower prices for customers and increase competition on the Dutch market. €3.8bn was raised in the auction, which is unprecedented for a country with a population of a mere 16 million.

In 2015, the organisation launched a new mobile network. The scheme cost approximately $187 million and had been in development since 2014.

In 2019, Tele2 Netherlands merged with T-Mobile Netherlands. As part of the purchase, Tele2 AB acquired a 25% share in T-Mobile Netherlands.

Norway
Tele2 Norway consists of the brands Tele2, OneCall, MyCall and Network Norway. On 7 July 2014, it was announced that Tele2 would be acquired by Telia Company. On 5 February 2015, the deal was approved by Norwegian competition authorities.

Russia

Tele2 started the operations in the Russian Federation by acquiring 12 regional mobile operators from its sister company Millicom in 2001. This has been expanded to a current 43 regions and with a customer base of over 44 million subscribers, Russia is Tele2's largest market by customer base.

On 28 March 2013 Tele2 announced that they would sell their Russian operations to the bank VTB for US$2.4 billion plus $1.15 billion in net debt.

Sweden

Sweden is where Tele2 originated and it remains one of its strongest markets serving over 4 million customers.

When the Swedish Post and Telecom Authority awarded four licenses for the 3G UMTS mobile networks in December 2001, Tele2 was among the winners. Notably Telia, the former telephony incumbent in Sweden, did not receive a license and so an agreement was established to build a 3G network shared by Tele2 and Telia using Tele2's license. SUNAB builds, owns and operates that 3G network.

A similar company, Net4Mobility, was formed in 2009 between Tele2 and Telenor Sverige for the purpose of building a joint 4G LTE network. Unlike 3G, both said companies were awarded frequency licenses and so it is likely that this network will outperform other Swedish operators networks simply because there are more available frequencies for the customers. The 4G product was officially launched on 15 November 2010 and currently (as of May 2012) covers over 90 municipalities. "National" coverage, able to serve 99% of the population in Sweden, has an expected completion date at the end of 2012. As the equipment used by Net4Mobility can serve both LTE and 2G, the new network built primarily for LTE will also replace the aging 2G networks of Tele2 and Telenor, providing lower cost through shared infrastructure. In addition, it enables EDGE, a service previously not available via Tele2.

On 24 May 2020, Tele2 became the first mobile network operator in Sweden to commercially launch a 5G NR network, initially in the Stockholm area and from 24 June 2020 was also extended to Gothenburg and Malmö.

United Kingdom

In a Court of Appeal case with a judgment published on 21 January 2009, companies in the Tele2 group were successful in a claim for damages against Post Office Ltd. for wrongful termination of a contract concerning the sale and promotion of telephone cards. The Post Office had grounds to terminate the contract at the start of 2004 because of the failure of the Tele2 companies to provide a parent company document due at the end of 2003. The Post Office continued to fulfil its obligations under the contract until they sought to terminate it in December 2004, some 11 months after the breach. The Appeal Court held that the waiver clause in the contract, which stated that
 could not be relied upon where the party entitled to enforce the term had not merely delayed action but had positively "elected" to continue to fulfil its contractual obligations, as evidenced by its behaviour.

Criticism
During its operation in the United Kingdom and Italy, Tele2 was criticised for using the practice of telephone slamming (changing consumer's residential phone line over to a new provider without their consent). In Italy the company was also criticised for blocking P2P traffic without warning its consumers.

The company was also criticised for faking a meteorite landing in Latvia in October 2009, as a result of which the Latvian government cancelled its contract with Tele2.

It is currently under investigation for competition and acquisition irregularities in Lithuania, as well as losing its case brought by its Lithuanian competitor through the competition watchdog over LTE ad speed claims. BITE, its fastest growing Lithuanian competitor won its case through the competition authority. It has also been fined and criticised by The Competition Council over misleading advertising.

It has grown a reputation for aggressive market practice and has been involved in court cases and legal criticisms in several other countries, including Poland.

Tele2 pulled out of the Finnish market stating problems with the competitive and regulatory environment after the Finnish government had previously cancelled their 3G licence.

See also 

 List of Swedish television channels

References

External links
 

Telecommunications companies established in 1993
Cable television companies
Internet service providers of Sweden
Mobile phone companies of Sweden
Television in Sweden
Swedish brands
Stenbeck family
1993 establishments in Sweden
Companies based in Stockholm
Companies listed on Nasdaq Stockholm